13 dita is the first solo album by Italian pianist Giovanni Allevi, released in 1997 by Soleluna Records.

Track listing
 Il nuotatore – 3:15
 Parole – 3:17
 Cassetto – 5:46
 Scherzo n°1 – 4:22
 Room 108 – 3:10
 Sogno di Bach – 2:05
 Improvviso n°1 – 3:24
 Facoltà di filosofia – 3:57
 Toccata in 10/16 – 2:35
 Japan – 3:13
 Volo sul mondo – 2:47
 Anelli – 4:32
 Stella – 3:27
 Carta e penna – 3:14
 L'ape e il fiore – 3:19

1997 debut albums
Giovanni Allevi albums
Instrumental albums